George Daniel Sofroni (born 10 June 1991) is a Romanian footballer. He plays for New Bradwell St Peter. He made his debut in Liga I for Ceahlăul Piatra Neamţ.

References

External links
 

1991 births
Living people
Romanian footballers
Association football midfielders
CSM Ceahlăul Piatra Neamț players
FC Callatis Mangalia players
CSM Roman (football) players
New Bradwell St Peter F.C. players
Liga I players
Liga II players
Romanian expatriates in Wales
Expatriate footballers in Wales